Crnčići is a village in the municipality of Višegrad, Bosnia and Herzegovina.

See also 
Bosanska Jagodina massacre

References

Populated places in Višegrad